Rogelio Sinán (born on Taboga Island in 1902; died in 1994) was the pseudonym of  Panamanian writer Bernardo Domínguez Alba. He went to universities in Chile and Italy before becoming a consul to Calcutta. He has written plays, short stories and novels, but is best known for his poetry. His work has been termed Avant-garde and he is a winner of the Premio Ricardo Miró.

References 

Panamanian male writers
Panamanian short story writers
Male short story writers
1902 births
1994 deaths
Panamanian expatriates in Chile
Panamanian expatriates in Italy
Panamanian expatriates in India